Matrika Prasad Koirala (1 January 1912 – 11 September 1997) was the Prime Minister of Nepal for two terms from 16 November 1951 to 14 August 1952 and again from 15 June 1953 to 11 April 1955.

Personal life
Koirala was born to Krishna Prasad Koirala and his first wife Mohan Kumari Koirala in 1912 in Varanasi, British Raj. His brothers were Bishweshwar Prasad Koirala and Girija Prasad Koirala, who also served as the Prime Minister of Nepal, and politician and journalist Tarini Prasad Koirala.

Political career

Matrika Prasad Koirala (M.P.) was an outstanding personality of Nepal, who dominated Nepali politics for a full eight years from 1947 to 1955. During the first four years he was supreme leader of the anti-Rana movement, and during the last four years he was the Prime Minister. His first four years were a story of success, whereas his last four years were a record of failure, though he was a powerful head of the government and enjoyed the
confidence of the King throughout most of those years. He led the
successful anti-Rana movement as its supreme commander, but his
activities as Prime Minister were controversial and a sign of failure.  

After 1955, his political career virtually ended, though King Mahendra
nominated him as a member of the upper house of parliament in 1959,
only to encounter the absolute majority of Nepali Congress. In the 1980s
M.P. once again tried to come back in politics through election to the
national legislature but he did not succeed.
M.P. died in 1997, but now he is with us through his memoir entitled
A Role in a Revolution. I myself (along with some of my friends in the
History Department at Tribhuvan University) was fortunate enough to
have carried out a tape-recorded interview with M.P. for the Centre for
Nepal and Asian Studies (CNAS) in the 1980s. This interview covered
some crucial issues which he faced and tackled during the anti-Rana
movement and during his tenure of office as a Prime Minister. While
taking his interview, we were quite impressed by his sharp memory as
when he narrated the story of his father's activities, and also described his
own role during the anti-Rana movement and as Prime Minister. We
requested him to write a memoir to provide first-hand information about
this crucial period of the history of Nepal from 1947 to 1955. He smiled
and said, "Well, if the government puts me in jail for six months, my
memoir will be complete." We are glad to know that he wrote this
memoir, but, as mentioned in the preface of the book, a reputed (I would
like to say irresponsible) publisher from New Delhi lost his original
manuscript (p. vii). M.P.’s courage must be highly applauded because he
390 Studies in Nepali History and Society 13(2), 2008
took great pains to rewrite his memoir, which has now been published in
book form.
Prior to reviewing the contents of the book, we must congratulate and
thank Ganesh Raj Sharma for his painstaking efforts to produce this
volume, along with his ten-page preface which includes his own analyses
of one or two political issues. One, on the basis of his conversation with
M.P. Sharma, which has also been entrusted with this responsibility by
M.P.’s wife, as he had already produced a significant volume on the
autobiography of B.P. Koirala (M.P.’s younger half brother) and on the
basis of his interview with B.P. himself. In a way, Sharma has become a
unique person by producing two volumes on two brothers, two Prime
Ministers and two big personalities of modern Nepal.
M.P.’s memoir is not complete. As the name of the book suggests, it
contains M.P.’s experiences as a leader of the democratic movement
against the Ranas from 1947 to 1951, along with his own family
background and a critical overview of the Rana regime. A large number
of documents, ninety two in total, have been attached as an appendix in
part two of the book, from which we can extract a rough picture of the
political history of Nepal from 1951 to 1955, especially on issues in
which M.P. was involved. But for that to be useful, one must have a
detailed knowledge of the events of those fateful years.
Divided into nine sections, the first part of the memoir focuses on
three main aspects of Nepali history. They are M.P.’s childhood and
youth along with his father's exiled life in India and afterwards; the
positive and negative aspects of Rana rule; and finally the democratic
movement starting with the formation of the NNC (Nepali National
Congress) and ending with the Delhi Compromise.
M.P. admits that his father (Krishna Prasad Koirala) was very
sophisticated and lavish in his habits, but later on became very austere. He
would not smoke, though he was the sole distributor of all brands of
imported cigarettes in Nepal; he would never even touch a dice, shells or
cards, even though gambling was officially and openly permitted for
several days a year. But the irony of history is that such a man in just one
stake "gambled away his whole life's earnings" (p. 5), and chose to live an
exiled life in India. M.P. describes his father's miserable condition in
India and also his younger brother's (Hari) death of cholera at Bettia "for
want of proper treatment" (pp. 6–8). He appreciates his father's decision
to give up all facilities, including a house provided by the Maharaja of
Kolhapur, since he was fighting against the atrocities of a Maharaja (of
Nepal) (pp. 8–10). M.P. recollects how, upon the death of Chandra
Book Reviews 391
Shamsher, the new Prime Minister immediately summoned his father to
Nepal, but tells us how he (Krishna Prasad) again suffered at the hands of
the next Prime Minister resulting in his painful death inside the jail. M.P.
writes, "Albeit, the policemen surrounded even the dead body and stood
guard until his mortal remains were consumed by the funeral pyre and his
body was reduced to ashes" (pp. 68–69).
Writing about himself, M.P. describes his school life in India
including his meeting with Mahatma Gandhi and Jawaharlal Nehru as a
school boy. He gives a brief account of the national education of India
initiated by Gandhi and Tagore (pp. 47–48), and a glimpse of the civil
disobedience movement of 1930 in which he himself was involved
(pp. 51–58). His employment under the Rana regime, first as an
apprentice and then as translator, is discussed in detail, and an interesting
incident that took place on the day of his appointment is narrated in an
attractive way (pp. 63–64). He tells us how he was relieved from his job
two months after his father's arrest in 1942 and how the Prime Minister
subsequently reacted when the Director General, upon the advice of
M.P.’s English boss, requested reconsideration of his sacking, by saying
“Tell your Angrej (Englishman) it is our Nepali politics which he is
incapable of understanding" (p. 67).
Giving a brief picture of the Rana regime, M.P. rightly calls it a time
of "plots, assassinations, and fights for power within the family," and says
that the ruling family looted the entire property of the nation, seeing it as
their own estate (p. 19). He gives the example of Padma Shamsher, who
was Prime Minister for less than three years and took more than six
million rupees in cash when he left for India (p. 21). But his mention of a
Rana having two million acres of land in birta holdings must be an
exaggeration (p. 21).
M.P. is judicious in making a critical appreciation of the Rana Prime
Ministers. He gives credit to Jang Bahadur for granting political asylum
to Chand Kuwar and Hazrat Mahal, and taking back the Naya Muluk
lands in the Tarai from the British. He considers this as "permanent
achievements for the nation" (p. 24). He also has words of praise for other
Prime Ministers who undertook certain reform-oriented activities for the
country. So much so that he even appreciates the attempt of Mohan
Shamsher Rana in getting Nepal admitted to the United Nations in 1955
(p. 28). Not to forget that it was against Mohan that the Nepali Congress
launched the movement and ended Rana rule.
Coming to the socio-political aspects of the Rana rule, M.P. narrates
some of his personal experiences with the Rana government, and
392 Studies in Nepali History and Society 13(2), 2008
mentions how people (including high officials) lived in a state of terror.
When Krishna Prasad Koirala told Juddha Shamsher that the Ranas were
interested only in "three B's," namely Bank, Birta and Building, his elder
brother (possibly Kali Dass Koirala), who was just promoted to Sardar
was very afraid that he might lose his job (pp. 33–34).
M.P. gives credit to the Prachanda Gorkha and Praja Parishad
organizations who revolted against the Rana regime before Nepali
Congress. Most historians argue that King Tribhuvan had a secret
connection with Praja Parishad and donated some money to it. But M.P.
writes that King Tribhuvan "flatly denied (his) participation and
knowledge of it. The money he gave to Mr. Bhakta (Dharma Bhakta
Mathema – a leader of Praja Parishad) which was found during the
searches was for the specific purpose of Mr. Bhakta's marriage" (p. 37).
However, he admits that "King Tribhuvan had moral sympathy with any
effort against the Ranas to set up a popular representation in the
governance of the country" (p. 37).
To close his narration about the Rana rule, M.P. argues that the
“tallest claim the Rana clan has made is the preservation of independence
of the country" (p. 38). In reality, and ironically, "they kept the country
locked in, including its independence" (p. 41).
The last four sections of the book form the most significant part of the
memoir as they are the most relevant to the title of the book. In over one
hundred pages, M.P. analyzes the history of the democratic movement,
especially focusing on his role in it. M.P. also mentions certain events
beyond his role in order to maintain coherence in the memoir. Although
these events have been discussed on the basis of secondary sources,
readers will still find new information in them (though this should still be
verified by primary sources).
M.P. starts his analysis of the Nepali democratic movement with B.P.
Koirala's press statement of October 1946 and the formation of the Nepali
National Congress (NNC) in January 1947. He, however, does not
mention the foundation of All India Nepali National Congress, which was
established on the last day of October 1946. M.P. gives great importance
to the Biratnagar Jute Mill Strike (1947). He claims that it was due to his
active role in the strike that he was made working president of NNC
without being a primary member of the party (p. 84). Most writers believe
that he was forced to resign just three months after his appointment,
because of opposition from members representing Kathmandu. But M.P.
insists here that he voluntarily resigned. However, he admits that D.R.
Regmi was made president to represent Kathmandu (p. 95). M.P. also
Book Reviews 393
argues that Shri Prakash Gupta prepared four different drafts of the 1948
Constitution (p. 94). This is new information and should be verified by
other sources.
On the clash between B.P. Koirala and D.R. Regmi, the author writes,
“while B.P. Koirala was insistent D.R. Regmi was no less a stickler.
There was no honourable way out" (p. 98). However, M.P. joined the
Koirala group "finding the juridical side in B.P.’s favour and in
consideration that Mr. Regmi was more of an academic politician than a
man of action" (p. 99). Later on, after the NNC split into two factions,
M.P. tried to make a compromise with Regmi but it failed because
“Regmi was adamant" (p. 103). We have read in books that after NNC
was banned, a few youths from Kathmandu founded the Praja Panchayat
to fight against the Rana regime through constitutional means. M.P.
claims that this organization was founded on his advice (p. 100).
Similarly, our history books only mention that M.P. was elected president
of NNC in the Daravanga Convention of March 1949, but M.P. claims
that B.P. Koirala and Gopal Prasad Bhattarai were also candidates for the
post. The election was held by secret ballot, and M.P. won with an
overwhelming majority (p. 102). At about the same time, M.P. had talks
with a trusted Mir Subba from Mohan Shamsher for a compromise
between the Congress and the Ranas (pp. 102–103). This attempt failed
because of the negative attitude of the Rana premier.
The merger of NNC and the Nepal Democratic Congress (NDC) that
took place in April 1950 is described in detail. M.P. has his own
arguments for his being chosen as the president of the new party – Nepali
Congress (NC) as against the claim of B.P. Koirala (pp. 106–112). The
new party replaced the words "Constitutional and peaceful means" by "all
possible means" in their objectives (p. 110). M.P. reveals how NDC
leaders made a false claim that they had the royal seal by King Tribhuvan
to form a provisional parallel government (p. 112).
M.P. admits that even before the Bairgania Conference (in September
1950), NC had collected sufficient quantity of arms, but he stood for
violence only "as a last recourse" and that also only in the form of mass
insurrections (p. 112). He presents K.I. Singh as an opponent of B.P.
Koirala from the beginning: He also mentions how Singh opposed the
idea of empowering a single man to launch the movement under the
assumption that B.P. would be that man (pp. 118–119). M.P. expresses
the difficulty he had in maintaining the secrecy of party decisions,
because of the presence of an undercover Rana agent in disguised form.
However he refuses to mention his name as he says “I cannot furnish
394 Studies in Nepali History and Society 13(2), 2008
specific proof or evidence for the same” (p. 118). M.P. also emphasizes
two incidents – getting the contact and commitment of Rudra Shamsher at
Palpa, which B.P. Koirala successfully conducted (p. 124), and a mission
to create a feeling of terror among the Rana authorities in the capital led
by Ganesh Man and Sunder Raj, which, however, failed because of a
betrayal by a driver (p. 126). King Tribhuvan's refusal to give royal
assent to punish the culprits is also narrated (p. 127).
When describing the royal flight to the Indian Embassy in November
1950, M.P. confirms the rumor, through King Tribhuvan, that leaving
Gyanendra in the palace was intentional and not accidental (p. 128). He
also mentions a rumor that Mohan consulted the British envoy after the
royal flight, and when the latter assured him that the new king will be
recognized, Gyanendra was proclaimed the new ruler (p. 129). However
M.P. is not correct to say that Gyanendra remained King from 7 November 1950 to 14 February 1951 (p. 132), because after Mohan's
declaration of 8 January 1951 he remained Tribhuvan's representative
only. The author has presented Tribhuvan's side of the story regarding the
mistake committed by Mohan after the royal flight (p. 129), but in my
opinion his version is difficult to accept as at that time the King was a
prisoner at Indian Embassy, if not at the royal palace.
In the chapter titled “Revolution” M.P. has analyzed in detail the story
of the 1950 Movement after the royal flight to Indian Embassy. The
reader is grateful for his ability to recollect day-to-day events. In the
beginning, the revolutionary force was unable to gain permanent control
of any major district, but later on it succeeded in capturing important
areas from government forces. M.P. is correct to say that “The close of
November was not very hopeful for us” (p. 152), but “the month of
December definitely brought us brighter beams of hope” (p. 161).
Especially significant in this regard was the capture of Biratnagar in the
east and Nepalgunj in the west. M.P. also describes the surrender of
government forces at Palpa as "a great event in the history of the
insurrectionary upsurge led by the NC...the fall of Palpa shook the Ranas
to the roots" (p. 167). At that time, when revolutionary forces were losing
battles against the Rana army, the NC leaders wanted to meet the King at
New Delhi to get a press statement from him in support of the movement.
NC leaders also wanted to meet Indian leaders to ask for their support in
logistics. "Both of our purposes were badly defeated," writes M.P. (p.
144). He indirectly questions the so-called favourable attitude of the
Indian government towards the NC, and writes, "we were in a deep pit
from where there was no escape. There certainly was a feeling amongst us
Book Reviews 395
that we had been brusquely let down, if not betrayed" (p. 144). Despite
the indifferent attitude of the then Indian government, the revolutionaries
were firmly committed to their duties. M.P. has duly acknowledged the
valuable contribution of a number of revolutionaries in the two-month
armed struggle against Rana rule, including the commanders of the Mukti
Sena such as Puran Singh, G.B. Yakthumba and others.
M.P. has also written a translation of a revolutionary song which was
often played on Democratic Radio, established in Biratnagar (p. 162). But
his translation does capture the actual wording of the song. In my opinion,
the translation of the song should be as follows:-
O Nepalis! March forward! Waving the flag of revolution!
Waving the flag of revolution
Come on elder and younger sisters
Come on elder and younger brothers
Let us work together for the salvation of our Nepal
Let all of us be united for the progress of our homeland
The NC started armed struggle against the Ranas with the support and
cooperation of the Indian government, but M.P. argues that Indian support
was half-hearted from the very beginning. When the Rana government,
realizing its helplessness, opened negotiations with the Indian
government, the attitude of India towards the NC completely changed.
M.P. has portrayed this episode beautifully in the chapter entitled “The
Delhi Parley.” He points out the change in attitude of the Indian Prime
Minister after he met two Rana generals, sent by the Rana Prime Minister
to negotiate at Delhi. He also gives Nehru's statement in the Indian
parliament as evidence that the Indian leader “held the view that complete
old order was not possible but a completely new order also was not in his
mind” (p. 172). M.P. mentions NC helplessness in these words, “In Delhi,
we never sat across the table to iron out our differences and the so-called
tripartite conference as such never took place. The representatives of the
Government of India would convey to us the views of the Ranas and of
course the King was out of the picture till the finalisation of the parley”
(p. 176). But, even at this critical juncture, the NC, under M.P.,
successfully solved the question of political prisoners, ensured the party's
right to nominate all the popular representations in the interim cabinet,
and got significant portfolios of home and finance (pp. 178–179).
Humiliated by the Indian government, M.P. was also defied by his
own partymen when they refused to accept him as their leader in the
interim cabinet. But M.P. rejects this allegation and writes, “In order to
396 Studies in Nepali History and Society 13(2), 2008
keep the prestige of the Nepali Congress aloft and to keep the ranks
closed up and to pave an easier path for the inner political struggle now to
begin inside Nepal I had preferred to place myself out of power, and exert
my energy to the organisational wing only” (p. 182). He was further
disappointed, when his proposal to include either M.B. Shah or Surya
Prasad Upadhaya in the Cabinet was opposed by B.P. Koirala and
Subarna Shamsher (p. 182). In name, M.P. was the supreme commander
of the revolution, but in practice his younger brother (B.P.) emerged as
the real hero. At this humiliating point, M.P. ends his memoir-cumautobiography.

The author has given a list of events that occurred after the royal flight (pp. 168–169). However the list contains some mistakes.
Gyanendra was installed as King on 7 November (not on 8 November);
M.P. gives the impression that the insurrection started even before
Tribhuvan reached Delhi, when it was not so. Mohan Shamsher's first
statement came on 24 December, (not on 24 November) and the first
batch of prisoners were released on 17 January 1951 (not on 13–14
January). Moreover, M.P. fails to mention that more than 50 percent of
released prisoners refused to come out of jail until the political settlement
was finalized. In addition, there is a major pen error on p. 130, where the
author writes “Padma” instead of “Mohan” (31st line).
Part two of the book consists of ninety-two documents which are
given as appendices. All of them, except the first and the last, are related
to the history of Nepal from 1951 to 1955 – a period when M.P. became
Prime Minister three times. This part of the book may be read as a
supplement to the memoir sections dealing with the later part of M.P.’s
political career.
These documents clearly show the Indian government's influence and
interference on Nepali affairs during the reign of King Tribhuvan. Three
documents are produced in original form. They are the cabinet proceeding
of April 1951 (pp. 194–195), Tribhuvan's letter to M.P. in August 1952
(p. 260) and Mahendra's letter to M.P. as a crown prince in March 1955
(p. 370). The first two letters are in English, prepared by Indian personnel,
and the third is in Nepali, to demonstrate Mahendra's attempt to end
Indian involvement in Nepal's administration. Again there are some
letters written by Nehru to Tribhuvan (pp. 200–202, 229–230, 231–232),
addressing the latter as “My dear friend” forgetting formal protocol to
address the head of the state. Similarly, M.P. had sought permission of the
Indian advisor to Nepal, quoting provisions of the Indian Constitution, to
remove a minister from the cabinet (p. 241).
Book Reviews 397
A number of letters had been exchanged between M.P. and Nehru on
different aspects of Nepali politics, which include (a) resolution of a
dispute between M.P. and B.P. Koirala (pp. 208–210), (b) Tanka Prasad's
demand for a coalition cabinet (p. 210), (c) Nehru's dissatisfaction on the
delay of Constituent Assembly election (p. 244), (d) M.P.’s detailed
information about the reorganization of administration in Nepal
(pp. 211–217) and (e) the discourtesy shown by an INA (Indian National
Army?) crew to the prime minister and ministers of Nepal (pp. 249–250).
Many voices were raised against the Indian Ambassador, Chandeshwar
Prasad Narayan Singh, by Nepali leaders, including B.P. Koirala, for his
active interference in Nepali affairs. However King Tribhuvan and M.P.
repeatedly requested the Indian Prime Minister for his renewal, which is
new information for readers (pp. 258–259).
It is worth mentioning one specific letter written by Nehru to M.P. on
8 May 1954, because it gives a number of instructions to M.P. as the
Prime Minister of Nepal, which include (a) Nehru's draft of an aidememoir for its approval by Nepal, (b) a warning to M.P. not to say
anything that would irritate China, (c) the presence of Indian
representatives in talks between Nepali and Chinese officials,
(d) instructions to the Nepal Government to give up extraterritorial rights
in Tibet as well as a 10,000 rupees tribute and (e) a threatening note to
remain careful about the U.S. (pp. 294–297). All these points clearly
demonstrate Nehru's dictatorial attitude towards Nepal. However, one
positive aspect of the letter should be mentioned, and that is Nehru's
instruction to Nepali ministers to keep in touch with their people (p. 297).
There are also some letters written by Nepali ambassadors in New
Delhi (Vijaya Shamsher and Mahendra Bikram) which focus on proposed
diplomatic relations between Nepal and China. One remarkable point of
these letters is the desire or condition of China to hold the talks in
Kathmandu and in secret, against the instructions of Nehru. These letters
also mention some objectionable articles on Nepal published in two
newspapers, Searchlight and The Statesman, as well as the statement of
D.R. Regmi (foreign minister) on Tibet, which the Indian government
called a “silly” statement. But these documents do not mention the
contents of these articles or the statement.
A number of brief letters (more than two dozen) written during the last
days of M.P.’s prime ministerial tenure have also been reproduced. They
deal with M.P.’s deteriorating relations with the Crown Prince and
ministers (Tanka Prasad and Bhadrakali Mishra) (pp. 346–373). However
these letters do not give any new information to the reader.
398 Studies in Nepali History and Society 13(2), 2008
On the whole, the documents produced in part two of the memoir give
scattered information on Nepali politics from 1951 to 1955. They may be
used by researchers as primary sources.
A review of M.P.’s memoir is not complete until we mention the tenpage preface of Ganesh Raj Sharma, the undeclared editor of the book.
Sharma argues that “M.P. was not as regular nor as expressive in his
response to ideas and events as B.P. was” (p. viii), but, instead, “was a
store house of knowledge about the personalities and events of Nepali
politics, which remained unrevealed unlike in the case of B.P. Koirala”
(p. ix). In my opinion, the memoir is more regular, if not more expressive,
than B.P.’s Atmabrittanta, which is quite irregular in chronological terms.
Sharma is correct to say that “M.P. was appointed Prime Minister in 1951
on the suggestion of Nehru,” but his claim that M.P. was removed from
office in 1955 because of India's displeasure, as he along with King
Tribhuvan opposed the aide-memoir sent by Nehru, is debatable (p. ix).
He has produced a different version of the aide-memoir which reads,
“... especially on matters of Nepal's relationship with Tibet and China,
special advice will be sought from the Government of India” (p. xi),
whereas Nehru's draft of the same speaks only about “consultations” with
the Government of India (p. 298).
On the basis of information supplied by M.P. and Rishikesh Shah,
Sharma argues that Nehru had given tacit consent to King Mahendra for
the royal takeover of December 1960, though it was limited only to the
removal of B.P. Koirala and not the dissolution of the parliament (pp.
xi–xii) This point also seems to be debatable, in view of Nehru's strong
public condemnation of the coup. There is one more debatable point in
the preface, and that is the so-called understanding between “King
Birendra and B.P. Koirala to bring M.P. Koirala to power as a stop-gap in
the transition from the partyless Panchayat system to a multiparty
parliamentary democracy” (p. xii). B.P.’s question about the possibility of
M.P.’s becoming Prime Minister (p. xii) prevents Sharma from reaching
such big conclusions.
However, in the conclusion part of his preface, Sharma seems to have
strictly followed the duty (dharma) of an editor, when he says “The same
period and the leadership roles have been described somewhat differently
by his brother, B.P. Koirala. As the person tasked with bringing the
memoir of both M.P. and B.P. into publication, I have been careful to
ensure that their words are held sacrosanct other than in basic editing, so
that both brothers reach out to the readers in their own words and as they
wished” (p. xv). Sharma, however, does not elaborate the points of
Book Reviews 399
difference between the two brothers, the narration of which would have
greatly benefited readers and researchers.
To point out some technical shortcomings, the documents in part two
are not numbered, nor are the sections in part one. This may create
difficulties for researchers who wish to acknowledge them as sources.
Similarly, readers may have been interested to see some rare photos of
those days, but the book contains none. Even so, the memoir is a
significant contribution to the study of the 1950 movement and the
following four years. It is especially helpful to researchers as a source
book.
Tri Ratna Manandhar
Tribhuvan University

References

1912 births
1997 deaths
20th-century prime ministers of Nepal
Finance ministers of Nepal
M
Nepali Congress politicians from Koshi Province
People from Biratnagar
Politicians from Varanasi
Prime ministers of Nepal
Members of the National Assembly (Nepal)